Tubbreva exaltata is a species of marine gastropod mollusc in the family Anabathridae. First described by Badwn Powell in 1933 as Notosetia exaltata, it is endemic to the waters of New Zealand. There are two subspecies, Tubbreva exaltata exaltata and Tubbreva exaltata sorenseni.

Description

Powell described the species as follows:

The species measures 1.55mm, by 0.9mm.

Subspecies

In 1965, Winston Ponder reclassified the species Notosetia sorenseni (originally described by himself in 1955) as a subspecies of Tubbreva exaltata, due to the two groups' similar appearances. the new subspecies, now known by the name Tubbreva exaltata sorenseni, differs by having a shorter spire and relatively more inflated body whorl.

Distribution

The species is endemic to New Zealand. The holotype was collected by either A.W.B. Powell or C.A. Fleming in February 1933, offshore from Owenga Beach in the Chatham Islands. It is found in the south of the South Island, the Chatham Islands and the New Zealand Subantarctic Islands, with specimens reported as far north as Taranaki on the west coast of the North Island.

References

Anabathridae
Gastropods described in 1933
Gastropods of New Zealand
Endemic fauna of New Zealand
Endemic molluscs of New Zealand
Molluscs of the Pacific Ocean
Taxa named by Arthur William Baden Powell